Jagat Singh II  (17 September 1709 – 5 June 1751), was the Maharana of Mewar Kingdom (r. 1734 – 1751). He succeeded his father Sangram Singh II. 

He spent the fortunes of his kingdom while trying to place his nephew, Madho Singh I on the throne of Jaipur, he was defeated at the Battle of Rajamahal and forced to pay heavy tributes to Jaipur. He was also unable to pay his mercenaries who ravaged his country.

References 

Mewar dynasty
1709 births
1751 deaths